The Rivière aux Rouilles (English: Rusty River) is a tributary of the Saint-Maurice River, flowing on the north bank of the Saint Lawrence River, entirely in the Lac à la Tortue from the city of Shawinigan, in the administrative region of Mauricie, in the province of Quebec, in Canada.

The course of the Rouilles river descends into the forest zone, passing from the south side of the hamlet Lac-Pratte. Its upper course drains marsh areas on the east and south sides.

Geography 
The Rivière aux Rouilles rises at the southwestern limit of the Lac-à-la-Tortue Ecological Reserve in the Lac-à-la-Tortue sector of the town of Shawinigan. This source is located at:
  south-east of Lac à la Tortue;
  south-east of the south-east bank of the Saint-Maurice River;
  north-west of the limit of Notre-Dame-du-Mont-Carmel.

  westward, to the bridge on chemin Saint-Mathieu range
  north-west, to its confluence.

The Rivière aux Rouilles flows into a river curve on the south bank of the Saint-Maurice River upstream from the Shawinigan dam and downstream from the railway bridge which spans the Saint-Maurice River at the foot from the Grand-Mère dam. The confluence of the Rivière aux Rouilles is located upstream of the La Gabelle dam at:
  downstream of the Grand-Mère dam;
  upstream of the Ile des Hêtres located upstream of the Shawinigan dam on the Saint-Maurice river.

Toponymy 
The toponym Rivière aux Rouilles was formalized on March 6, 1975, at the Commission de toponymie du Québec.

See also 

 List of rivers of the Saint-Maurice basin
 List of rivers of Quebec

References 

Rivers of Mauricie
Shawinigan